The women's long jump event at the 2020 Summer Olympics took place on 1 and 3 August 2021 at the Japan National Stadium. 30 athletes from 23 nations competed. Germany's 2019 world champion Malaika Mihambo moved up from third  to first with her final round jump of 7.00 metres, to win the gold medal. 2012 Olympic champion Brittney Reese of the USA won the silver and Nigeria's Ese Brume the bronze.

Summary
Returning from the Rio podium, silver medalist Brittney Reese now a month short of turning 35, and bronze medalist Ivana Španović. Gold medalist Tianna Bartoletta did not qualify to return. 2019 World Champion Malaika Mihambo was here, along with the rest of the 2019 podium Maryna Bekh-Romanchuk and Ese Brume. Reese was 2017 Champion over Bartoletta. In fact, Reese had medaled in every major competition since 2009 until missing out in 2019.

Only two made the automatic qualifier in their first attempt, Tara Davis and Khaddi Sagnia. After three attempts, eight made it. It took 6.60m to reach the final. In an upset, Darya Klishina of the ROC failed to set a mark in the qualifying round.

Brume took the lead in the first round with a 6.97m, with Mihambo in second at 6.83m. Španović moved into second on her second attempt with a 6.91m. Seconds later, Mihambo answered with a 6.95m. Reese also jumped 6.97m on her third attempt and held a 6.81m second attempt to use as a tiebreaker to take over the gold medal position. Bekh-Romanchuk landed her only legal attempt to keep herself in the competition, but still out of reach of the podium. In the fourth round, Reese improved her second best jump to 6.87m, Brume answered with a 6.88m to take over gold position. Reese came back in the fifth round to jump 6.95m to get back the tiebreaker into gold position. On her final attempt, Mihambo jumped  to grab gold. Brume improved to 6.90m on her final attempt, not enough to improve the color of her medal. And Reese's 6.84m fell short as well. Reese repeated as silver medalist.

Background
This was the 19th appearance of the event, having appeared at every Summer Olympics since 1948.

Qualification

A National Olympic Committee (NOC) could enter up to 3 qualified athletes in the women's long jump event if all athletes meet the entry standard or qualify by ranking during the qualifying period (the limit of 3 has been in place since the 1930 Olympic Congress). The qualifying standard is 6.82 metres. This standard was "set for the sole purpose of qualifying athletes with exceptional performances unable to qualify through the World Athletics Rankings pathway." The world rankings, based on the average of the best five results for the athlete over the qualifying period and weighted by the importance of the meet, will then be used to qualify athletes until the cap of 32 is reached.

The qualifying period was originally from 1 May 2019 to 29 June 2020. Due to the COVID-19 pandemic, the period was suspended from 6 April 2020 to 30 November 2020, with the end date extended to 29 June 2021. The world rankings period start date was also changed from 1 May 2019 to 30 June 2020; athletes who had met the qualifying standard during that time were still qualified, but those using world rankings would not be able to count performances during that time. The qualifying time standards could be obtained in various meets during the given period that have the approval of World Athletics. Both outdoor and indoor meets are eligible. The most recent Area Championships may be counted in the ranking, even if not during the qualifying period.

NOCs can also use their universality place—each NOC can enter one female athlete regardless of time if they had no female athletes meeting the entry standard for an athletics event—in the long jump.

Competition format
The 2020 competition continued to use the two-round format with divided final introduced in 1952. The qualifying round gives each competitor three jumps to achieve a qualifying distance of 6.75 metres; if fewer than 12 women do so, the top 12 (including all those tied) will advance. The final provides each jumper with three jumps; the top eight jumpers receive an additional three jumps for a total of six, with the best to count (qualifying round jumps are not considered for the final).

Records
Prior to this competition, the existing world, Olympic, and area records are as follows.

Schedule
All times are Japan Standard Time (UTC+9)

The women's long jump took place over two separate days.

Results

Qualifying 
Qualification Rules: Qualifying performance 6.75 (Q) or at least 12 best performers (q) advance to the Final.

Final

References

Women's long jump
2020
Women's events at the 2020 Summer Olympics
Olympics